Teng Jinxian (24 May 1937 – 7 March 2022) was a Chinese film director, producer, screenwriter and stage actor.

Life and career
Teng was born on 24 May 1937 in Jizhou District, Tianjin. He graduated from the Chongqing Tsinghua Middle School in 1959 and the Performance Department of Sichuan Drama School in 1961. After, he became an actor at the Sichuan Provincial People's Art Theater.

At some point he became the film director of Emei Film Studio and co-directed "Sacred Mission" and "Girl's Wish". In 1980s, he independently directed the film "A Capable Wife" and the opera "Pirate's Daughter", also he wrote the screenplays "Last Emperor" and "Tagliarisai".

In 1987, he was appointed a director of the Film Bureau of the Ministry of Radio, Film and Television. From 1987 to 1993, Teng served as the deputy director of the Jury of the Film Government Awards.

Teng died on 7 March 2022, at the age of 84.

Filmography

Director

Sacred Mission (1979) (together with Mao Yuqin)
Girl's Wish (1981) (together with Mao Yuqin)
A Capable Wife (1982)
Pirate's Daughter (1983)

Producer
Cross the River (1988)
Chongqing Negotiation (1994)

References

External links
 

1937 births
2022 deaths
Chinese film directors
Film directors from Tianjin
Members of the 8th Chinese People's Political Consultative Conference
Members of the 9th Chinese People's Political Consultative Conference
Members of the 10th Chinese People's Political Consultative Conference